

History
Universal's Superstar Parade was a parade at Universal Studios Florida. It was first announced at a live webcast on January 25, 2012. The parade included characters, floats, and themed-vehicles based on Universal Pictures and Illumination Entertainment's Despicable Me and Hop films, as well as Paramount and Nickelodeon's SpongeBob SquarePants, Dora the Explorer, and Go, Diego, Go! television series. Each section of the parade had a unique mix of performers, from aerialists to drummers to acrobatics. The parade was notable for having “show stops” in the New York and Hollywood sections of the park where an elaborate choreographed dance routine would take place. Leading up to the parade, each individual unit would make appearances throughout the day for smaller shows and meet-n-greets. The parade debuted on May 8, 2012, as part of Universal Orlando's "Year To Be Here".

In November 2016, Universal announced that the Hop unit would be replaced by Illumination Entertainment's The Secret Life of Pets-themed floats. This unit introduced break dancers performing stunts, bicyclists, and puppets of the film’s main characters.

Closure
Following a week of rumors, Universal officially announced the parade's ending date on May 18, 2022. The parade ended its 10-year run with its last performance on June 4, 2022. The final performance utilized an additional float from the theme park's Mardi Gras parade, to allow additional Universal team-members to participate in the festivities.

Legacy
A performance of this parade in January 2016 led to the infamous "Dabbing Squidward" meme. The original Vine video of a Universal team-member dabbing inside a Squidward Tentacles mascot costume garnered 22 million views within a week. The video led to widespread virality, and even officially-licensed merchandise of the meme by Nickelodeon.

See also
 2012 in amusement parks

References

External links
Press Release

Parades in the United States
Universal Parks & Resorts attractions by name
Universal Studios Florida
Amusement rides introduced in 2012
SpongeBob SquarePants
Nickelodeon in amusement parks
Licensed properties at Universal Parks & Resorts
2012 establishments in Florida